The Changtang is part of the Tibetan Plateau in western and northern Tibet and extending into India.

Changtang may also refer to:

Towns or townships in China
 Changtang, Anhua (长塘镇), a town of Anhua County, Hunan
 Changtang, Linxiang (长塘镇), a town of Linxiang City, Hunan

 Changtang, Dongkou (长塘瑶族乡), a Yao ethnic township of Dongkou County, Hunan

Other uses
 Chang Tang Nature Reserve (羌塘国家级自然保护区), a nature reserve in the northern Tibetan Plateau of China